European route E 57 is an intermediate E-road connecting the Austrian city of Sattledt with the Slovenian capital city of Ljubljana via Liezen, St. Michael, Graz and Maribor.

In Austria, it follows the A9 motorway, also called Pyhrnautobahn. In Slovenia it follows the A1 motorway.

Itinerary 
The E 57 routes through two European countries:

Austria 
Starting at the junction with the E56 from Nuremberg to the north-west and the E60 from Salzburg to the south.

Slovenia

References

External links 
 UN Economic Commission for Europe: Overall Map of E-road Network (2007)

E057
E057
57